Baaz is a 1992 Indian Hindi-language thriller drama film directed by S. Subhash, starring Govinda and Sonam. The film was a remake of Tamil film Jeeva (1988).

Plot
Deva is a professional photographer. His life takes an unexpected turn when one of his model is killed. The killer asks for a diary but Deva is totally unaware about it. He tries to find out the killer and his motive.

Cast
 Govinda as Deva
 Sonam
 Archana Puran Singh as Monica
 Tinnu Anand as Somnath
 Anjana Mumtaz
 Dalip Tahil
 Dinesh Hingoo
 Sudhir as Gogi

Soundtrack

References

External links
 

1992 films
Films scored by Anand–Milind
1990s Hindi-language films
Indian films about revenge
Indian thriller drama films
Hindi remakes of Tamil films
1992 action thriller films